Dalessandro's Steaks & Hoagies is a cheesesteak restaurant that was founded in 1960 in Roxborough, a neighborhood in Philadelphia, Pennsylvania, United States.  When referring to Dalessandro's, The New York Times declared that "Philly food could be summed up by those cheese steaks".

History

Italian American William Dalessandro opened Dalessandro's in 1960 on Ridge Avenue in Roxborough. In 1961, the restaurant moved to its current location at Henry Avenue and Wendover Street. In 2009, former food cart operator Steve Kotridis and his wife, Margie, bought the business from the Dalessandro family.

In June 2016, the restaurant received national publicity when Tonight Show host Jimmy Fallon, a known Dalessandro's fan, served future Philadelphia 76ers #1 draft pick Ben Simmons a Dalessandro's cheesesteak on the show.

Reception
The restaurant finished runner-up to Jim's Steaks South Street location in Philadelphia Business Journal's poll for best cheesesteak in the region. Niki Achitoff-Gray and Ed Levine of Serious Eats applauded Dalessandro's meat as the "real prize".

In July 2017, U.S. News & World Report named Dalessandro's as one of the top five cheese steaks in Philadelphia.

Gallery

See also
 List of submarine sandwich restaurants

References

External links
 

Submarine sandwich restaurants
Restaurants in Philadelphia
1960 establishments in Pennsylvania
Restaurants established in 1960
Northwest Philadelphia